or tsume (詰め) is the Japanese term for a shogi miniature problem in which the goal is to checkmate the opponent's king. Tsume problems usually present a situation that might occur in a shogi game (although unrealistic artistic tsume shogi exists), and the solver must find out how to achieve checkmate.  It is similar to a mate-in-n chess problem.

The term tsumi (詰み) means the state of checkmate itself. The verb form is tsumu (詰む) "to checkmate". (The related term tsumero 詰めろ refers to the slightly different concept of "threatmate". See: Hisshi.)

Tsume shogi problems are strictly forced mate problems with constant checks. They assume that the player is in brinkmate and that they will lose unless they can force a mate sequence with a check on every move. The situation simulates real shogi games in which the endgame is essentially a mutual mating race.

Note that the concept of stalemate as in western chess does not exist in shogi as it essentially does not occur.

Rules

Tsume problems have set rules for how they must be constructed and completed.  If the solver breaks any of the rules, he has not solved the problem correctly.  If the composer breaks any rules, he has not constructed a tsume shogi.

 The attacking side's king is usually not present on the board. If it is, it is called a sōgyoku tsume shōgi (双玉詰将棋) problem.
 All of the attacking side's moves must be checks.
 White (the defender, or the side with the king) must move in such a way to delay checkmate as long as possible. So a mate earlier than the given moves is called an earlier mate.
 White has in hand all pieces not in the board or in the attacking side's hand, not counting the other king.
 White can drop any piece in hand to delay or prevent checkmate.
 Black cannot make a mate line longer than the given. So, he cannot extend a mate in 65 puzzle to a mate in 225.

Purposes of tsume problems
Tsume problems can be used to fulfill one of two tasks: to train in shogi strategy or to be created as a work of art.

Shogi training
Tsume problems are considered very good training for playing shogi.  They teach not only how to effectively checkmate the king but also to predict moves and plan out a long series of moves before achieving a goal.  There are many websites and books dedicated to tsume problems for this purpose.

As a work of art
Many shogi players for centuries have created tsume problems with long and deliberate mating lines as artwork.  They might consist of the pieces making geometric shapes, a theme which is used throughout the problem, the removal of all pieces on the board (called a Smoke Mate), or a set number of moves.  One of the most famous tsume artists is Kanju Itou, who in 1755 wrote Shogi Zukou (将棋図巧), a famous collection of artistic tsume problems. The main tsume shogi prize in the shogi world is the "Kanju Prize".

Entering king

As a practical matter, when an opponent's king has entered a player's own territory, the opponent's king is often very difficult to mate given the forward attacking nature of most shogi pieces. This state is referred to as entering king (入玉 nyū gyoku). If both players' kings are in entering king states, the game becomes more likely to result in an impasse. (See Shogi § Impasse rule.)

Tactics

Mating with gold

A common move in the endgame is to checkmate an opponent's king with gold drop when the position that the gold is dropped to is also defended by another piece.

Japanese has three terms for this depending on the position of the gold in relation to the king. A gold dropped directly in front of the king is 頭金 atamakin ("head-gold"). 尻金 shirikin ("buttocks-gold") is gold position directly behind the king, and 腹金 harakin ("belly-gold") is a gold placed on the side of the king.

Since many pieces (pawn, lance, knight, silver) can all promote to gold-like piece, checkmate by a gold is usual.

Because of the relative ease of mating with a gold compared to other pieces, it is often advantageous to keep a gold in hand during the endgame so that a mate with a dropped gold can be executed.

Mating and promotion

Since mate by gold is a fundamental checkmate tactic in shogi, it is common for pieces to promote into a gold to deliver checkmate.

For instance, a silver defended by a pawn can mate at the head of a king but only if the pawn is promoted. A silver protected by a pawn, lance or rook cannot attack the side squares (62, 42) leaving two escape routes for the king unless there is a knight behind the defender.

As another example, a knight may mate a king if promoted to a gold as well (as shown in the diagrams to the right). If the knight didn't promote here, then there would be no checkmate.

Mating and unpromotion

In other situations, staying unpromoted can lead to a mate while promoting does not result in mate. 

In the example, if the knight on 85 moves to 73 and does not promote, it attacks the king and delivers checkmate (since the horse is also attacking the rank 2 squares in front of the king). However, if the knight moved to 73 and promoted to the gold-like narikeima, then the promoted knight isn't attacking the king leaving White a chance to counterattack to avoid checkmate.

The same is true with the silver example to the right. If the silver promoted at 83, then it would not be checkmate since a gold-like promoted silver cannot attack diagonally backward.

Piece sacrifice

It is common in shogi to sacrifice pieces – that is, attacking with the expectation that the attacking piece will be immediately captured – in order to check the king forcing the king to move to a checkmateable position. Since shogi utilizes piece drops, dropped piece sacrifices are especially useful in checkmating patterns.

In this 5-move mate example, Black can execute a 3-move mate sequence if the White's king were positioned on the 91 square. Therefore, in order to get White to move their king to that position, Black drops his rook to the 91 square in a sacrifice move. Since White is now in check and without any safe square for an escape, White must capture the rook with his king.

Now, with the king on 91, Black can check the king with a bishop drop to 73. 

Now the White's king is trapped. If the king tries to flee down the ninth file to 92, then Black will simply promote their bishop on the 82 square mating the king. The same applies to fleeing to across rank 1 (...K-81, B-82+) or attempting to drop a defending piece between the king and the bishop (...G*82, Bx82+).

Fast checkmates

Like the famous Scholar's mate in western chess, shogi has a well-known early mate sequence related to the joseki for Cheerful Central Rook vs Static Rook games. 

For instance, if Black is playing Cheerful Central Rook, then if White deviates from the jouseki and blunders by creating a wall with either of their silvers (S-62 or S-42), then Black will give a double check with their rook and promoted bishop rendering an 11-move mate as follows:

{|
| 1. || P-76 || P-84
|-
| 2. || P-56 || P-54
|-
| 3. || R-58 || P-85
|-
| 4. || P-55 || Px55
|-
| 5. || Bx55 || S-62?
|-
| 6. || Bx33! ||  
|}

Similar variants of this sequence are also possible. For example, Kitao (2011) offers the following position with these implied moves:

{|
| 1. || P-76 || P-84
|-
| 2. || P-56 || P-54
|-
| 3. || R-58 || S-62
|-
| 4. || P-55 || Px55
|-
| 5. || Bx55 || P-34?
|-
| 6. || Bx33! ||  
|}

Fastest shogi checkmate

In a sense, this a fairly unlikely mate sequence (cf. the Fool's mate in western chess).

1. P-76. Black's bishop diagonal is opened.

1...G-72. An unusual move early made by White. In the current configuration, the gold is stacked on top of the right silver creating a wall blocking White's king from fleeing rightward past the central file.

2. Bx33+?? A very bad blunder. Black trades his bishop for merely a pawn and promotes. Although the promoted bishop is checking White's king, it's meaningless. The game is now strongly in White's favor.

2...G-42?? An equally bad move by White. Although moving the left gold up does resolve Black's check, this allows Black's promoted bishop to simply retreat to its original place, escaping material loss (although White can capture the retreating bishop with 3. Bx88+, Black can capture back with 3...Sx88, ending up to be a bishop exchange). The better natural move here would be for White to simply capture Black's promoted bishop with their own bishop (2...Bx33). The game now has swung back and favors Black slightly.

3. +Bx42? Black captures the gold. While trading the bishop with a gold is necessary sometimes, it is not the case here. White's favor again.

3...K-61?? White's king runs from the promoted bishop. This is the losing blunder. Instead, the only move here is for the king to capture the promoted bishop (3...K-42).

4. G*52. Dropping the gold on the 52 square gives checkmate. 

If White had not created the wall structure with the gold and silver stacked on 72 and 71, respectively, White's king could have moved rightward or, even better, the gold in its starting position on 61 could have defended the 52 square.

See also

 Hisshi
 Shogi strategy

Notes

References

Bibliography

External links
 Tsume Shogi (Shogi Mating Problems)
 Tsumeshogi Q&A
 YouTube: HIDETCHI's videos:
 How to play Shogi (将棋): Lesson #30: Checkmate Problems
 Famous Shogi Mate Problems · playlist of annotated videos
 Shogi Shack:
 ABC of Tsumi
 Guide to On-line Tsume Shogi Resources
 Tsume for Beginners
 More Tsume Problems · 7-move problems
 I-tsu-tsu Blog: Mate Problem: Jammed with Good Points

Shogi theory